The MRTC 3000 class or ČKD Tatra RT8D5M LRV, also known as Tatra Train, is a class of high-floor light rail vehicles built by Czech tram manufacturer ČKD Tatra. It is currently used on the Manila MRT Line 3 and were the last made by ČKD Tatra before it was taken over by Siemens.

ČKD Tatra RT8D5M LRVs are owned by Metro Rail Transit Corporation (MRTC), and operated by the Department of Transportation (DOTr) thru DOTr MRT-3.

Purchase 
The Manila MRT Line 3 construction began in 1996 when the then-Department of Transportation and Communications (DOTC; later the Department of Transportation) entered into a build-lease-transfer agreement with the Metro Rail Transit Corporation (MRTC). MRTC signed a contract with ČKD Tatra in 1997 to supply the trains for the line.

Aside from a prototype, 73 light rail cars are produced by ČKD in two batches; 49 were produced in 1998 and the other 24 were completed the following year. The first train was flown into Manila via plane while the remaining trains were transported by sea. The fleet also happens to be the last produced by ČKD before it was taken over by Siemens.

Design and specifications 

The LRV design is a one-way eight-axle motorized car consisting of three articulated cars, which are connected to each other by the joint and the cover.

Car body 
The car body is made of low-alloy high-tensile steel, while the ceiling is made of aluminum sheets.

Unlike the prototype 0029, these cars have rounded "foreheads" or beveled large windows at both ends.

The trains wear a livery consisting of royal blue, red, and white. Under the "Metrostar Express" branding, the white portion contains the brand logo and lettering on the sides. However, since 2012, the branding has since been unused. The trains also usually wore wrap ads—unlike the LRTA 1200 class which wear ads as a whole trainset, the 3000 class are seen to wear wrap ads per car.

Each light rail vehicle has three roof-mounted air-conditioning units manufactured by Thermo King. In total, there are nine air-conditioning units in a three-car train set.

LRV 044 used to have experimental door lights above the doors in 2017. However, the lights were removed when Sumitomo refurbished and renumbered LRV 044 as 3044 in 2021.

Interior 
Each train car has a capacity of 74 seated passengers and 320 standing passengers. Under crush loading conditions, each car can carry 394 commuters at any one time. A 3-car trainset can carry 1,182 passengers. Seats are longitudinal-type.

Each car has five double leaf, electronically operated, plug-sliding doors.

The Passenger Assist Railway Display System (PARDS), a passenger information system powered by LCD screens installed near the ceiling of the train that shows news, advertisements, current train location, arrivals and station layouts, are already installed inside the trains. However, as of 2022, the LCD screens remain switched off. PARDS is also installed on trains on LRT lines 1 and 2.

Prototype RT8D5 0029
In March 1995 the first three-car tram was tested in Prague under the number 0029 as a prototype. It was a development of the Tatra KT8D5; 0029 retained its control, proportions, the front and rear sections, and unlike the later production vehicles, designed for bidirectional operation. Prototype 0029 remained in Prague and it was used in October to November 1998 together with the Tatra T5A5 prototype, tram no. 0013, and the T3 no. 6663 for various crash tests in the main workshop in Hostivař before being eventually scrapped.

Mechanical
Each LRV has inside-frame bogies, consisting of four motorized bogies. The primary suspension is a steel spring and the secondary suspension is a wound-up steel spring. Scharfenberg couplers are present in the ends of the light rail vehicles.

Electrical
The electrical and traction systems of the RT8D5M trains are supplied by ČKD Trakce. The propulsion is controlled by choppers with IGBT thyristors. The traction motors consist of eight DC series-wound/wave armature winding self ventilated motors. The traction motors have a Class H insulation class for the rotor and a Class F insulation class for the stator. The motors comply with IEC 349 standards. The motors are rated with a voltage of 375 volts, a current of 190 amps, and a speed of 1946 revolutions per minute (rpm) with a maximum speed of 4350 rpm.

The auxiliaries include three 480-volt AC static converters and two 24-volt DC batteries.

Signaling and safety equipment
The trains are equipped with the EBICAB 900 Automatic Train Protection (ATP) system. Some onboard signaling equipment consist of vehicle logic units (VLUs), driver panels, and antennas. The original VLUs were manufactured by Bombardier Transportation (acquired by Alstom in 2021). The VLUs are the primary automatic safety devices for the trains.

In 2017, it was revealed that the original VLUs were stolen and replaced with unauthorized parts. An audit report by Bombardier Transportation showed that 99% of the trains were using fake parts. According to the inventory conducted in all cars, the other cars were equipped with ABB, ABB Daimler-Benz or DaimlerChrysler-branded VLUs.

The EBICAB 900 ATP system is integrated with the CITYFLO 250 signaling solution of the MRT Line 3 supplied by Bombardier Transportation.

Operations 
The RT8D5M operates as built on the high-speed city rail system with high platforms and in tropical conditions. The vehicles are mainly operated in threes, and operations with four-car trainsets were first planned in 2016. The trains have been in use since the opening of the line in 1999 and has undergone two refurbishments.

On March 9, 2022, a four-car 3000 class trainset underwent a dynamic test run on the main line for the first time. Two four-car trains were deployed on March 28, subsequently increased to four by April 18.

Refurbishments

First refurbishment (2008–2009)
In 2008, during the line's first general overhaul, the trains were first refurbished by Sumitomo Corporation, Mitsubishi Heavy Industries and TES Philippines Inc. (TESP). The aging air-conditioning units of the trains since 1999 were replaced with new ones. The interior and exterior of the trains were also refurbished. Sumitomo Corporation, along with MHI and TESP refurbished 73 light rail vehicles (LRVs) from 2008 to 2009.

Second refurbishment (2016–2017, 2019–2023)

43 light rail vehicles were planned to be overhauled under the maintenance of Busan Universal Rail, Inc. The refurbished cars underwent a body repaint and installation of new air-conditioning units from Thermo King. The refurbishment commenced in 2016. However, due to service interruptions in 2017 that attributed to the poor maintenance of BURI, the Department of Transportation terminated its contract with BURI on November 6, 2017 with only three LRVs refurbished.

The plan to refurbish the trains were again announced in December 2018 as part of the line's rehabilitation project, which includes the refurbishment of the entire fleet of 72 light rail vehicles. It began on May 1, 2019, and was carried out by Sumitomo Corporation, Mitsubishi Heavy Industries and TES Philippines Inc. (TESP). Initially expected to be completed in May 2023, the refurbishment of all 72 light rail vehicles (LRVs) was completed three months ahead of schedule on February 2, 2023.

The rehabilitation project of the LRVs consists of the installation of new choppers, traction motors, wheels, pantographs, air conditioning units from Thermo King (a replacement program for the air conditioning units began as early as 2018); the repainting of the train's exteriors and interiors; and the fitting of new lighting installations throughout the trains. SKD Trade, a. s., the company that produces spare parts for trains made by ČKD Tatra, became part of the overhaul project and provided spare parts for the trains. Meanwhile, 120 new Thermo King air conditioning units were ordered for 40 LRVs. The installation of the new air-conditioning units on all trains were completed on June 18, 2021.

Incidents 

 On November 3, 2012, a train from the Araneta Center-Cubao Station caught fire as it approached GMA-Kamuning Station, causing passengers to scramble to the exits, and having two women injured. The train caught fire due to electrical short-circuit technical failure.
 On March 26, 2014, at 10:50 am, a southbound train at Guadalupe Station suddenly stopped due to the train driver not observing the red light status at the Guadalupe Station and accelerated southbound without getting prior clearance from the Control Center, causing the automatic train protection system to activate the emergency brakes, resulting in 10 injuries.
 On August 13, 2014, a southbound train heading to Taft Avenue station derailed and overshot to the streets. The train first stopped after leaving Magallanes station due to a technical problem. Later on, the train broke down altogether,  another train was used to push the stalled train. During this process, however, the first train got detached from the rails and overshot towards Taft Avenue, breaking the concrete barriers and falling to the street below. At least 38 people were injured. The accident was blamed on 2 train drivers and 2 control personnel for failing to follow the proper coordination procedures and protocol. The A and B sections of the involved train car were loaded sideways onto two flatbed trucks, while the C section of the car was towed to the depot using a hi-rail truck. The train car is still stored at the line's depot in North Avenue as of June 2020. There are currently no news about actions to be taken at the damaged trainset, and was noticeably excluded from train refurbishments.
 On September 2, 2014, a train continued with one of its doors left open after a train door failed to close at the Guadalupe station. The passengers were then evacuated after the train arrived at Boni station.
 On September 18, 2017, at 6:00 am, a seat inside 3000 class LRV no. 066 caught fire at the Santolan-Annapolis station with no injuries reported.
 On November 16, 2017, at 11:30 am, at least 140 passengers were evacuated from a "detached train" coach between the railway lines of Buendia and Ayala Avenue Stations.
 On January 26, 2018, a train caught fire between the Araneta Center-Cubao and GMA-Kamuning stations. Partial operations were implemented, and the situation normalized at 2:46 pm.
 On August 7, 2018, an aircon leak caused "rain" inside a train and caused passengers inside to open their umbrellas. The train was removed from service to fix the air conditioning unit and the train involved in the incident returned to service the following day.
 On November 4, 2019, at 4:08 pm, a train suddenly emitted smoke while on the northbound track of the line. Around 530 passengers were unloaded. Around two hours after the incident, the operation of the line was back to normal. The fire was caused by a short-circuit in the traction motor.
 On May 12, 2021, 3000 class LRV 015 was vandalized by an unidentified culprit near Taft Avenue station. Investigations were conducted and initial reports state that the culprit had cut the perimeter fence near Taft Avenue station, which may have caused the vandalism. The vandalized train was cleaned and returned to service on May 18, 2021.
 On October 9, 2021, at 9:12 p.m., 3000 class LRV 032 caught fire near the Guadalupe station. A provisional service was implemented between North Avenue and Shaw Boulevard station, and the site of the incident was declared fire out at 9:51 p.m. As a result of the incident, 8 passengers sustained minor injuries. Normal operations resumed the following day.
 On November 21, 2021, at 6:51 a.m., a window in a 3000 class LRV was damaged due to a stoning incident, injuring one passenger. The suspect was later identified as a garbage collector and was subsequently arrested and charged.

See also 
 MRT Line 3 (Metro Manila)
 Metro Rail Transit Corporation
 MRTC 3100 class

Notes

References

Further reading 

 
 Official DOTC MRT3 Website 
 
 
 Website of the tram manufacturer, ČKD

Rolling stock of the Philippines
RT8MD5
Tram transport
Train-related introductions in 1999
750 V DC multiple units